Oosterland refers to two villages in the Netherlands:

 Oosterland, Zeeland
 Oosterland, North Holland